In the Dough is a 1933 American Pre-Code comedy film starring Fatty Arbuckle and featuring Shemp Howard of the Three Stooges. It was the last film made by Arbuckle, although the last to be released was Tomalio. He died of a heart attack in the early morning hours of June 29, 1933, the day after completing work on the film.

Plot
Slim starts his first day of work at a bakery on the same day that local gangsters pay a visit to his boss, Mr. Shultz, demanding protection money. When Mr. Shultz refuses to pay, the gangsters hatch a plan to destroy the bakery, but the plan doesn't quite work out the way they thought it would.

Cast
 Roscoe 'Fatty' Arbuckle as Slim
 Fritz Hubert
 Gracie Worth as Maisie
 Lionel Stander as Toots
 Shemp Howard as Bugs
 Dan Coleman as Mr. Shultz
 Ethel Davis
 Dexter McReynolds
 Marc Marion as Bakery clerk
 Ralph Sanford as the Cop
 Fred Harper as Mr. Smith
 Lawrence O'Sullivan

See also
 Fatty Arbuckle filmography

References

External links

1933 films
1933 comedy films
1933 short films
American black-and-white films
Films directed by Ray McCarey
Films produced by Samuel Sax
Vitaphone short films
American comedy short films
Warner Bros. short films
1930s American films